"Midnight Rocks" is a song written by Al Stewart and Peter White and was performed by Stewart.  The song appeared on his 1980 album, 24 Carrots.

"Midnight Rocks" reached No. 24 on the Billboard Hot 100 singles chart and No. 13 on the Adult Contemporary chart in the United States in 1980. The song peaked at No. 79 in Canada.  It also charted modestly on the Canadian Adult Contemporary chart (#46).  The song was the last charting single by Stewart.

Charts

References

1980 singles
1980 songs
Al Stewart songs
Arista Records singles